Aciagrion heterosticta is a species of damselfly in the family Coenagrionidae. It is found in the Democratic Republic of the Congo, Namibia, Uganda, and Zambia. Its natural habitats are moist savanna, freshwater lakes, intermittent freshwater lakes, freshwater marshes, and intermittent freshwater marshes.

References

Coenagrionidae
Insects described in 1955
Taxonomy articles created by Polbot
Taxobox binomials not recognized by IUCN